Euvola is a genus of marine bivalve mollusks in the family Pectinidae, the scallops. In shells of this genus, one valve is flat, and the other is deeply cupped.

Species
Species in the genus Euvola:
Euvola papyracea (Gabb, 1873) — paper scallop
Euvola raveneli (Dall, 1898) — Ravenel's scallop
Euvola vogdesi (Arnold, 1906)
Euvola ziczac (Linnaeus, 1758) — zigzag scallop

References

Pectinidae
Bivalve genera